The Bellona Foundation is an international environmental NGO headquartered in Oslo, Norway, with branches in Europe and North America. Founded in 1986 by Frederic Hauge and Rune Haaland as a direct action protest group to curb Norway's oil and gas industry pollution, it grew to be multi-disciplinary and multinational in scope and in present day maintains offices in Oslo, Brussels, Berlin and Vilnius. In 2022, Bellona ended activities in Russia and relocated experts to the Vilnius, Lithuania office to assist Ukraine with environmental challenges resulting from the Russian invasion. Bellona works with ecologists, specialists in the natural and social sciences, engineers, economists, attorneys, and journalists to accomplish its objectives.

Goals 

In order to solve environmental issues, Bellona collaborates with organizations of environmental activists, scientific professionals, governments, and other NGOs. These include addressing the effects of climate change, eradicating Russia's nuclear legacy from the Cold War, and ensuring the security of oil and gas production and processing in Norway and Europe.

Bellona created the so-called "B7" collaboration initiative with the commercial sector in 1998. It specified preferential goals, individual projects, and programs to deal with the environmental concerns and issues. Altogether, seven focus areas were determined: environmental rights, international environment work, environmental management, environmental economy, environmental technology, energy and Envirofacts.

History 

In 1994, the Bellona Foundation's report "Sources of Radioactive Contamination in Murmansk
and Archangel Counties" raised serious concerns about the safety of the decommissioned soviet nuclear-powered submarines after the dissolution of the USSR. In February 1996, Russian FSB arrested Bellona's Russian expert Alexander Nikitin, a former Soviet naval officer, and charged him with treason through espionage for his contributions to Bellona's report on the nuclear safety within the Russian Northern Fleet. The Russian Supreme Court completely exonerated him in 2000.

In 2003, Bellona accessed radioactive contamination at Sellafield nuclear reprocessing facility in England.

At the 2009 United Nations Climate Change Conference (COP15) in Copenhagen, Bellona presented "101 Solutions to Climate Change".

In 2013, Bellona Foundation filed a police report after it learned that a "disposal well in the Norwegian Sea owned by Norway’s state oil company Statoil leaked 3,428 tons of hazardous chemicals and oil-based drilling fluids over six years at the Njord site".

Strategy 

Since the B7 program's inception in 1998, more than 100 companies, organizations, and enterprises have participated. In 2003, among Bellona's B7 partnership program with business and industry were: Aker Kværner, Aker RGI, Applied Plasma Physics, Bertel O. Steen, Braathens, Conoco Phillips Norway, Coop Norge, E-CO, Eidesvik, Eiendomsspar, Energos Energy and Industry, Eramet, Ferrolegeringens Forskningsforening, Norwegian Fishing Vessels Owners Association, Fred Olsen, Marine Harvest, Confederation of Norwegian Business and Industry (NHO), Federation of Norwegian Processing Industries (PIL), Norway Post, Select Service Partner, Water Power Industries (WPI), Uniteam, Norske Shel, Skretting, Statkraft, and Statoil.

As a consequence of the Bellona Foundation's realization that the environmental movement would not be able to drive the required adjustments to fight the looming challenges to the environment on its own, the organization began working with industry and business. Through the B7 program, Bellona wanted to aid those enterprises that were willing to take the environment protection in earnest. It also wanted to offer businesses an arena on which they could take the step from being a part of the problem to becoming a part of the solution.

Additionally, Bellona has contributed to the promotion of renewable energy in Russia.

Funding 

Bellona's yearly spending was 25 million Norwegian Kroner (NOK) in 2001. Among the sources: 10 million NOK came from selling advertising; 6 million NOK was received from the Norwegian Ministry of Foreign Affairs for projects in Russia, and 1 million NOK was received from the Norwegian government for general purposes; 6 million NOK was received from business sector to implement the B7 program; 2 million NOK came from sales of reports, donations and gifts.

Criticism 

In Norway, the Bellona Foundation was criticized for "publicity seeking", and in Russia — for accepting funds from the Norwegian government. Some maintain that Bellona damaged its environmental credibility by "cooperating with market agents", transforming it into more of a consultancy for private companies than an environmental NGO.

See also
CC9

References

Further reading 
 Galina Stolyarova. Ecologists: 10,000 Tons Of Waste Headed for City, The St.Petersburg Times, September 26, 2008 (Issue # 1411)

External links
 Bellona Foundation, Official website in English, Norwegian and Russian

Environmental organisations based in Norway
Foundations based in Norway
Anti–nuclear power movement